Émile Souvestre (April 15, 1806July 5, 1854) was a Breton novelist who was a native of Morlaix, Brittany. Initially unsuccessful as a writer of drama, he fared better as a novelist (he wrote a sci-fi novel, Le Monde Tel Qu'il Sera) and as a researcher and writer of Breton folklore. He was posthumously awarded the Prix Lambert.

Biography

Education
He was the son of a civil engineer and was educated at the college of Pontivy, with the intention of following his father's career by entering the Polytechnic School. However, his father died in 1823 and he matriculated as a law student at Rennes but soon devoted himself to literature.

He was by turns a bookseller's assistant and a private schoolmaster in Nantes, a journalist and a grammar school teacher in Brest and a teacher in Mulhouse. He settled in Paris in 1836. In 1848 he became professor in the school for the instruction of civil servants initiated by Hippolyte Carnot, but which was soon to be cancelled.

Literary career
This tragedy was a pronounced failure. In novel writing he did much better than for the stage, deliberately aiming at making the novel an engine of moral instruction. His first two novels  and  met with favourable receptions.

Souvestre published a series of articles in 1834 on Breton culture, and then an article on Breton poetry. He also wrote a number of other works—novels, dramas, essays and miscellanies.

In 1846, Souvestre published the ambitious  [The World As It Will Be], a full-blown dystopia and science fiction novel which featured some remarkable predictions. In it, a French couple, Maurice and Marthe are taken to the year 3000 by a man named John Progress on a flying, steam-powered, Time traveling locomotive. There, they discover the existence of steam-powered subways, submarines, synthetic materials imitating real wood, marble, etc., telephone, air conditioning, giant fruits and vegetables obtained through what we would call today genetic engineering, etc. The world is one nation, the capital of which is Tahiti.  Parenting has vanished, because most children are removed from their parents and taken to places where eugenics, genetic manipulation, and different forms of education give rise to somewhat human grotesques tailored for specific tasks. Corporations have enough power to influence government decisions to ensure good profit margins. The medical community manipulates people to ensure that they are seriously sick when they enter, and conducts medical experiments on animals. This is paid for by cutting costs in the food the patients receive. No sympathy or encouragement is given to the poor or disabled. China has become inactive and listless, going into a steep decline after their socio-economic structure was ruined by opium, and wars and murders occur in Persia for idiotic religious reasons. Russia seems more or less a backwater obscurity, and Germany is a jingoistic nation that permits freedom while undermining it at the same time.

Death and legacy
Souvestre died in Paris on July 5, 1854. His widow was awarded the Prix Lambert, awarded jointly by the Académie française and the Académie des Beaux-Arts, for the moral quality of his work. French sculptor and Souvestre's friend Philippe Grass made his portrait on his tomb at the Père Lachaise Cemetery.

Marie Souvestre, the feminist writer and educator who was a major influence on Eleanor Roosevelt, was his daughter.

Works

 Un Philosophe sous les toits 
 Confessions d'un ouvrier 
 Au coin du feu 
 Scènes de la vie intime 
 Chroniques de la mer 
 Les Clairières 
 Scènes de la Chouannerie 
 Dans la Prairie 
 Les derniers Paysans 
 En quarantaine 
 Sur la Pelouse 
 Les Soirées de Meudon 
 Souvenirs d'un Vieillard, la dernière Étape 
 Scènes et Récits des Alpes 
 Les Anges du Foyer 
 L'Echelle de femmes 
 La Goutte d'eau 
 Sous les Filets 
 Le Foyer breton 
 Contes et Nouvelles 
 Les derniers Bretons 
 Les Réprouvés et les Élus 
 Les Péchés de jeunesse 
 Riche et Pauvre 
 En Famille 
 Pierre et Jean 
 Deux Misères 
 Les Drames parisiens 
 Au bord du Lac 
 Pendant la Moisson  
 Sous les Ombrages 
 Le Mat de Cocagne 
 Le Mémorial de famille 
 Souvenirs d'un Bas-Breton 
 L'Homme et l'Argent 
 Le Monde tel qu'il sera 
 Histoires d'autrefois 
 Sots la Tonnelle

References

External links

 
 
 English translation of The World as It Shall Be
  (including 28 'from old catalog')

1806 births
1854 deaths
People from Morlaix
French science fiction writers
Collectors of fairy tales
Burials at Père Lachaise Cemetery
19th-century French novelists
19th-century French dramatists and playwrights
French male novelists
19th-century French male writers
Writers from Brittany